David Aucagne (born 14 February 1973) is a retired French rugby union player. Aucagne, who played at fly-half, has been the coach of the French under-20 team since retiring in 2008. He made his debut for France against Wales on 15 February 1997.

Biography
Aucagne played for Vichy, his hometown team, as a youngster, but he moved to Paris Université Club, where he was coached by Daniel Herrero, in 1991. He spent five years with Paris before being offered the opportunity to play at a higher level with Pau. With Pau he won the Challenge Yves du Manoir in 1997, this was the only major trophy he won during his career. Aucagne later had spells with Toulouse, Grenoble and Montpellier.

Aucagne made his international debut during the 1997 Five Nations Championship, in which France completed the Grand Slam.

References

External links
FFR profile 

1973 births
Living people
People from Vichy
French rugby union players
France international rugby union players
Rugby union fly-halves
Stade Toulousain players
Montpellier Hérault Rugby players
Sportspeople from Allier